The following are the results of the 2009 Proton Malaysian Open doubles:

Mariusz Fyrstenberg and Marcin Matkowski won in the final 6–2, 6–1 against Igor Kunitsyn and Jaroslav Levinský.

Seeds

Draw

Finals

External links
 Main Draw

Doubles